Here's to Shutting Up is the eighth studio album by American indie rock band Superchunk. Brian Paulson, who served as co-producer, previously worked with the band on 1994's Foolish.

The band left "Phone Sex" out of the initial performances of the accompanying tour; with the September 11, 2001 attacks a painfully fresh memory, the members felt uncomfortable performing a song featuring the lyrics "Plane crash footage on TV. I know, I know that could be me."

The title of the album is taken from the opening of the song "Out on the Wing."

Track listing
 "Late-Century Dream" – 4:37
 "Rainy Streets" – 2:07
 "Phone Sex" – 4:54
 "Florida's on Fire" – 3:11
 "Out on the Wing" – 5:51
 "The Animal Has Left Its Shell" – 3:32
 "Act Surprised" – 3:59
 "Art Class (Song for Yayoi Kusama)" – 4:15
 "What Do You Look Forward To?" – 7:41
 "Drool Collection" – 3:32

References

2001 albums
Superchunk albums
Merge Records albums
Albums produced by Brian Paulson